The Holocaust in Romania was the development of The Holocaust in the Kingdom of Romania. 380,000–400,000 Jews were murdered in Romanian-controlled areas, including Bessarabia, Bukovina and Transnistria. Romania ranks first among Holocaust perpetrator countries other than Nazi Germany.

See also
 
 
 History of the Jews in Romania

References

 
Jewish Romanian history
Romania
Antisemitism in Romania
Romania in World War II
Murder in Romania
Germany–Romania relations